The 2001 Major League Baseball postseason was the playoff tournament of Major League Baseball for the 2001 season. The winners of the League Division Series would move on to the League Championship Series to determine the pennant winners that face each other in the World Series.

In the American League, the New York Yankees made their seventh straight postseason appearance, the Seattle Mariners and Oakland Athletics returned for the second straight year, and the Cleveland Indians returned for the sixth time in eight years. The 2001 Mariners set an MLB record by winning 116 games during the regular season. This postseason was also the most recent to feature the Mariners until 2022.

In the National League, the Atlanta Braves made their tenth consecutive postseason appearance, the St. Louis Cardinals returned for the second year in a row, the Houston Astros made their third appearance in the past four years, and the Arizona Diamondbacks made their second appearance in the past three years.

The September 11 terrorist attacks on New York and Washington, D.C. pushed the end of the regular season from September 30 to October 7. Because of the attack, the World Series was not completed until November 4. The 2001 World Series was the first World Series to end in November.

The postseason began on October 9, 2001, and ended on November 4, 2001, with the Diamondbacks shocking the three-time defending World Series champion Yankees in seven games in the 2001 World Series. It was the first major league championship won by a team from Arizona.

Playoff seeds
The following teams qualified for the postseason:

American League
 Seattle Mariners – AL West, AL regular season, and league regular season champions, 116–46
 New York Yankees – AL East champions, 95–65
 Cleveland Indians – AL Central champions, 91–71
 Oakland Athletics – 102–60

National League
 Houston Astros – NL Central champions, NL regular season champions, 93–69 (9–7 head-to-head vs. STL)
 Arizona Diamondbacks – NL West champions, 92–70
 Atlanta Braves – NL East champions, 88–74
 St. Louis Cardinals – 93–69 (7–9 head-to-head vs. HOU)

Playoff bracket

Note: Two teams in the same division could not meet in the division series.

American League Division Series

(1) Seattle Mariners vs. (3) Cleveland Indians 

This was the second postseason meeting between the Mariners and Indians, they had previously met in the 1995 ALCS which the Indians won in six games en route to the World Series. The Mariners narrowly defeated the Indians in five games to return to the ALCS for the second year in a row. The Indians shocked the Mariners with a 5-0 shutout win in Game 1 in Seattle. The Mariners won Game 2 by a 5-1 score to even the series going into Cleveland. In Game 3, the Indians blew out the Mariners 17-2, handing Seattle its worst postseason loss ever. Going into Game 4, Cleveland looked poised to complete a historic upset, however the Mariners would prevail by a 6-2 score to force a series-deciding Game 5 at Safeco Field. The Mariners managed to win Game 5 and advance to the ALCS.

This was the most recent playoff win for Seattle until 2022, where they swept the Toronto Blue Jays in the Wild Card series.  This was the last postseason appearance for the Indians until 2007.

(2) New York Yankees vs. (4) Oakland Athletics 

In a rematch of the previous year's ALDS, the Yankees rallied from a 2-0 series deficit to once again defeat the Athletics in five games. The Yankees returned to the ALCS for the fifth time in the past six seasons. The Athletics took Games 1 and 2 in the Bronx, and looked poised to eliminate the Yankees. However, when the series moved to Oakland, the Yankees took Game 3 in a 1-0 shutout, and then blew out the Athletics in Game 4 to even the series. Game 5 of this ALDS was memorable for a play by Derek Jeter in the top of the eighth inning. During that inning, Oakland's Terrance Long hit a towering foul pop up in a two-run game. Jeter then went after the ball making a backhanded grab, and then turning his body, flipped into the stands. For a moment, no one knew if the ball had been caught, but it was eventually confirmed. The Yankees took Game 5 by a 5-3 score, and returned to the ALCS.

The Athletics would make their next postseason appearance in 2003, where they lost to the Boston Red Sox in five games in the ALDS after blowing another series lead. 

Game 5 of the 2001 ALDS is shown in the opening scene of the 2011 film Moneyball. The film shows Johnny Damon's first inning leadoff double followed by Jason Giambi’s RBI single. Then, the defensive miscues by Oakland are shown as three errors were committed. The final out of the game (Eric Byrnes striking out) is used as a transition point from the game footage to the actual beginning of the film.

National League Division Series

(1) Houston Astros vs. (3) Atlanta Braves 

In the third postseason meeting between these two teams, the Braves swept the top-seeded Astros to return to the NLCS for the ninth time in eleven years. This series was not close - the Braves took Game 1 in Houston by a 7-4 score, and then won Game 2 in a 1-0 shutout to go up 2-0 in the series heading back to Atlanta. The Braves put away the Astros in Game 3 by a 6-2 score to advance to the NLCS.

The Braves and Astros would meet again in the NLDS two more times - in 2004 and 2005, which were both won by the Astros.

(2) Arizona Diamondbacks vs. (4) St. Louis Cardinals 

This was the first postseason meeting between the D-Backs and Cardinals. The D-Backs prevailed in a back-and-forth five game series to advance to the NLCS for the first time in franchise history. The D-Backs took Game 1 in a 1-0 shutout, while the Cardinals won Game 2 by a 4-1 score to even the series and gain the home field advantage. In St. Louis, the D-Backs took Game 3 to regain the series lead, while the Cardinals took Game 4 in another 4-1 victory to send the series back to Phoenix for Game 5. The D-Backs narrowly defeated the Cardinals in Game 5 by a 2-1 score to advance to the NLCS.

Both the Cardinals and D-Backs would meet again in the NLDS the following year, with the Cardinals winning in a sweep.

American League Championship Series

(1) Seattle Mariners vs. (2) New York Yankees

In the third postseason meeting between these two teams, the Yankees upset the 116-win Mariners to advance to the World Series for the fifth time in six years. The series was lopsided in favor of the Yankees - the Yankees took the first two games in Seattle. When the series moved to the Bronx, the Mariners blew out the Yankees in Game 3 to avoid a sweep. However, the Yankees would win Game 4, and then proceeded to blow out the Mariners in Game 5 to secure the pennant. With the win, the Yankees improved their record against the Mariners to 2-1 all time. 

After the series loss, the Mariners entered a slump, and held the longest postseason appearance drought in North American sports. They would not return to the postseason again until 2022. The Yankees would win their next AL pennant in 2003 over their archrival in the Boston Red Sox in seven games.

National League Championship Series

(2) Arizona Diamondbacks vs. (3) Atlanta Braves

The D-Backs defeated the Braves in five games to advance to the World Series for the first time in franchise history. The teams split the first two games in Phoenix - the D-Backs took Game 1 in a 2-0 shutout win, while the Braves blew out the D-Backs in Game 2 to even the series. When the series moved to Atlanta, the D-Backs won Game 3, blew out the Braves in Game 4, and then clinched the pennant with a 3-2 victory in Game 5.

As of 2022, this is the only time the D-Backs have won the NL pennant. They would return to the NLCS in 2007, but were swept by the Colorado Rockies, who made a Cinderella run to the World Series.

This was the last time the Braves appeared in the NLCS until 2020, where they fell to the Los Angeles Dodgers in seven games after leading the series three games to one.

2001 World Series

(AL2) New York Yankees vs. (NL2) Arizona Diamondbacks 

This was the first World Series ever played in the Mountain West region. In what is considered by many to be one of the greatest World Series ever played, the D-Backs shocked the Yankees in seven games to win their first championship in franchise history, denying the Yankees a fourth straight title. 

The first two games were dominated by Arizona, as they blew out the Yankees in Game 1, and won Game 2 in a shutout. When the series moved to the Bronx, the Yankees narrowly took Game 3 to avoid a sweep. Then, the Yankees won Games 4 and 5, both in extra innings, due to two blown saves from Arizona's Byung-hyun Kim. The Yankees were now one win away from a fourth straight title. However, when the series moved back to Phoenix for Game 6, the D-Backs blew out the Yankees 15-2 to force a Game 7, handing the Yankees what was their worst postseason loss in franchise history until 2018. Game 7 was the most memorable contest of the series - the D-Backs scored first in the bottom of the sixth to go up 1-0. Then the Yankees scored two unanswered runs in the top of the seventh and eighth innings to take the lead. In the bottom of the ninth, the Yankees were two outs away from securing the title, however the D-Backs tied the game at two runs each, handing Yankees closer Mariano Rivera his first blown save in four years. The series then ended with a walk-off, bases-loaded bloop single by Luis Gonzalez to clinch the title for Arizona. This was the first World Series since 1991 in which neither team won a game on the road.

This was the first (and only) championship of the four major North American sports leagues won by a team from the Phoenix metropolitan area. The NBA’s Phoenix Suns reached the NBA Finals three times in their history - 1976, 1993, and 2021, but lost each time in six games. The NFL’s Arizona Cardinals reached the Super Bowl in 2009, but narrowly lost to the Pittsburgh Steelers. As of 2022, no other professional sports team from Phoenix has won a championship.

The D-Backs would return to the postseason the next year in hopes of defending their title, but were swept by the St. Louis Cardinals in the NLDS. The D-Backs returned to the NLCS in 2007, but were swept by the Colorado Rockies, who made a Cinderella run to the World Series. The Yankees hoped to earn a shot a redemption the following year, but were upset by the Anaheim Angels in the ALDS.

The Yankees would return to the World Series in 2003, but they were defeated by the Florida Marlins in six games. They would win their next championship in 2009, against the Philadelphia Phillies.

References

External links
 League Baseball Standings & Expanded Standings – 2001

 
Major League Baseball postseason